Ignisious Gaisah (born July 20, 1983) is a Ghanaian-born athlete competing in the long jump for the Netherlands.

Career
Gaisah moved to the Netherlands in 2001 and currently lives and trains in Rotterdam. He competes for P.A.C. Rotterdam.

In 2005 jumped a personal best 8.34 metres to win the silver medal at the World Championships in Helsinki, finishing behind Dwight Phillips. On February 2, 2006, in Stockholm he leaped to an African indoor record that also won him the gold medal in this event by jumping 8.36 metres. He continued his good form to win the 2006 IAAF World Indoor Championships a month later with a jump of 8.30 metres, followed quickly by the 2006 Commonwealth Games gold medal with a jump of 8.20 metres.

At the 2006 African Championships in Athletics Gaisah won the gold medal with an 8.51 m jump, beating Cheikh Touré's African record of 8.46 metres from 1997, but as the tail wind was too strong (+3.7 m/s) the result could not become a new record.
Since July 2013 Gaisah officially competes for the Netherlands after gaining his Dutch passport.

Competition record

References

External links

1983 births
Living people
Ghanaian male long jumpers
Dutch male long jumpers
Ghanaian emigrants to the Netherlands
Olympic athletes of Ghana
Athletes (track and field) at the 2004 Summer Olympics
Athletes (track and field) at the 2012 Summer Olympics
Athletes (track and field) at the 2010 Commonwealth Games
Athletes (track and field) at the 2006 Commonwealth Games
Commonwealth Games gold medallists for Ghana
Commonwealth Games bronze medallists for Ghana
Athletes from Rotterdam
World Athletics Championships medalists
World Athletics Championships athletes for the Netherlands
World Athletics Championships athletes for Ghana
European Athletics Championships medalists
Commonwealth Games medallists in athletics
African Games gold medalists for Ghana
African Games medalists in athletics (track and field)
Athletes (track and field) at the 2003 All-Africa Games
Athletes (track and field) at the 2007 All-Africa Games
Athletes (track and field) at the 2011 All-Africa Games
World Athletics Indoor Championships winners
IAAF Continental Cup winners
People from Kumasi
Medallists at the 2006 Commonwealth Games
Medallists at the 2010 Commonwealth Games